Macna rufus is a species of snout moth in the genus Macna. It was described by George Thomas Bethune-Baker in 1908. It is found in New Guinea.

References

Moths described in 1908
Pyralini